John Dent (born 15 February 1938) is a British biathlete. He competed in the 20 km individual event at the 1964 Winter Olympics.

References

External links
 

1938 births
Living people
British male biathletes
British male cross-country skiers
Olympic biathletes of Great Britain
Olympic cross-country skiers of Great Britain
Biathletes at the 1964 Winter Olympics
Cross-country skiers at the 1964 Winter Olympics
Place of birth missing (living people)